L. palustris may refer to:

 Lathyrus palustris, a wild pea species known by the common name marsh pea, native to Europe, Asia, and North America.
 Littoridinops palustris, a species of very small aquatic snail, an operculate gastropod mollusk in the family Hydrobiidae.
 Ludwigia palustris, a flowering plant species in the evening primrose family known by the common names marsh seedbox and water purslane.

See also
 Palustris (disambiguation)